Venom is a class of animal toxins.

Venom may also refer to:

Characters

Comics
 Venom (character), a symbiotic alien-life form and former enemy of Spider-Man in the Marvel Comics universe
 Eddie Brock, the first human host to use the name Venom and current host
 Mac Gargan, the original Scorpion, the third Venom host and the second to use the name Venom
Flash Thompson, the fourth Venom host
 Venom (comic book), several comic books
Venomm, a different Marvel Comics character

Film and television
 Venom, a character in the 2011 film Zookeeper
 Venom, a character in the 2007–2013 web series The Guild
 Venom, a character in the 2007 Philippine TV series Rounin
 Venom, a gladiator stage name in the 2008 TV series American Gladiators

Video games
 Venom Snake, a character from the Metal Gear series
 Venom, a character from the Guilty Gear series

Film
 Venom (1966 film) or Gift, a Danish film directed by Knud Leif Thomsen
 Venom (1971 film), a British horror film directed by Peter Sykes
 Venom (1981 film), a British thriller film directed by Piers Haggard
 Venom (2005 film), an American horror film directed by Jim Gillespie
 Venom (2018 film), an American film based on the Marvel Comics character
 Venom: Let There Be Carnage, an American film sequel to the 2018 movie

Music
 Venom (band), a British metal band
 Venom (Awesome Snakes album) or the title song, 2006
 Venom (Bullet for My Valentine album) or the title song, 2015
 Venom (Chamillionaire album), unreleased
 Venom (U-God album) or the title song, 2018
 Venom (soundtrack), a soundtrack album from the 2018 film
 Venom, an album by Impellitteri, 2015

Songs
 "Venom" (Eminem song), 2018
 "Venom" (The Shermans song), 2009
 "Venom", by Bvndit, 2022
 "Venom", by Jesswar, 2021
 "Venom", by Little Simz, 2021
 "Venom", by Stray Kids from Oddinary, 2022

People
 Florian Kohler (born 1988), French trick shot pool player, also known as "Venom"
 Joey Abs or Jason Arhndt (born 1971), American professional wrestler who also performed as "Venom"

Transportation
 Bell UH-1Y Venom, a utility helicopter
 Dodge Venom, a 1994 concept car
 de Havilland Venom, a jet fighter-bomber aircraft
 Hennessey Viper Venom 1000 Twin Turbo, a sports car
 Hennessey Venom GT, a sports car
 Hennessey Venom F5, a sports car
 HMS Venom, a list of ships
 HMS Venom (1794), a Royal Navy gunbrig
 Vickers Venom, a fighter aircraft

Other uses
 VENOM (Virtualized Environment Neglected Operations Manipulation), a computer security flaw that was publicly disclosed in 2015
 V.E.N.O.M. (Vicious Evil Network of Mayhem), a fictional organization in the M.A.S.K. media franchise
 Venom Games, a British video game developer
 Nashville Venom, a defunct professional indoor football team, Tennessee, U.S.
 Venom, home planet of Andross in the Star Fox video game series
 Venom, a fictional drug used by Bane in the DC Comics universe

See also
 Venomous (disambiguation)
 Venon (disambiguation)
 Sea Venom (disambiguation)
 Steel Venom (disambiguation)